Marcos Antônio Costa (born 18 December 1978), simply known as Preto, is a retired Brazilian footballer who played as a defender.

Honours
Santos
Campeonato Brasileiro Série A: 2002, 2004

References

External links
Preto at playmakerstats.com (English version of ogol.com.br)

1978 births
Living people
Sportspeople from Maranhão
Brazilian footballers
Association football defenders
Campeonato Brasileiro Série A players
Santos FC players